Under the law of the United Kingdom, whales (mammal) and sturgeons are royal fish, and when taken become the personal property of the monarch of the United Kingdom as part of his or her royal prerogative.

In England and Wales
According to William Blackstone's Commentaries on the Laws of England, the "superior excellence" of whale and sturgeon made them uniquely suited for the monarch's use. Sir Matthew Hale added porpoise as one of the royal fish. Near the English coast they belong to the monarch immediately upon being caught, while ownership is also transferred to the monarch when a catch from any location is cast up on the shores.  The kings of Denmark and the dukes of Normandy enjoyed a similar prerogative.

The monarch's right to royal fish was recognized by a statute enacted during the reign of Edward II.  According to Henry de Bracton, de balena vero sufficit ... si rex habeat caput, et regina caudam: "the king owns the head of the whale, the queen owns the tail". In Moby-Dick, Herman Melville quoted the speculations of jurist William Prynne, that the queen received the tail, in order to be supplied with whalebone for her corsets and stays (although as Melville points out, "whalebone" is in fact baleen, from the mouths of certain whales).  

Under current law, the Receiver of Wreck is the official appointed to take possession of royal fish when they arrive on English shores. The law of royal fish continues to excite some notice and occasional use, as evidenced when a fisherman caught and sold a sturgeon in Swansea Bay in 2004. After informing of the sturgeon to Queen Elizabeth II, the fisherman, a man named Robert Davies, received notice that he could use the 264lb catch 'as he saw fit'.

In Scotland
Authority to collect them on behalf of the monarch is given to the Scottish Government through the Marine Scotland directorate.

In Ireland
In Ireland the  English Crown,   which held  the Lordship of Ireland, also claimed the prerogative of taking royal fish,  which extended to porpoises and dolphins. There is  a record of a dispute between the Crown and Christopher St Lawrence, 2nd Baron Howth  in about 1440 over the  ownership of an exceptionally large  grampus (Risso's dolphin) which had been  stranded on Howth peninsula in Dublin Bay.  The Crown claimed  it as a royal fish, while  Lord Howth claimed it  on foot of the immemorial right  of his family to  take possession of every grampus and porpoise found on the peninsula.

See also
Swan Upping

References

External links
 

Law of the United Kingdom
Fisheries law
Legal history of the United Kingdom
Royalty in the United Kingdom
Royal prerogative